Abdoulaye Samaké (born 29 April 1987) is a Malian professional footballer who currently plays as a goalkeeper.

External links 
 

1987 births
Living people
Malian footballers
Association football goalkeepers
Mali international footballers
21st-century Malian people